China is the world's largest and earliest silk producer. The vast majority of Chinese silk originates from the mulberry silkworms (Bombyx mori). During the larval stage of its life-cycle, the insects feed on the leaves of mulberry trees. Non-mulberry silkworms cocoon production in China primarily focuses on wild silk from the Chinese Tussah moth (Antheraea spp.). This moth typically feeds on trees (e.g. oaks) and its larvae spin coarser, flatter, yellower filament than the mulberry silk moths.

In 2005, China accounted for 74 percent of the global raw silk production and 90 percent of the world export market.

Industrial plans

Local governments have and are continuing to introduce new facilities that are expected to bring in latest high-end silk manufacturing machinery that will elevate both the quality and the quantity of the silk being produced in China. It is estimated that it will render significant revenue increases as its new facilities bring increased production and distribution capabilities.

There are a number of material preferential benefits. These government incentives include such as land policy exemptions, tax breaks, project prioritization (priority in review and approval of applications), and Energy discounts (upon approval, company can receive discounts of fees related to water, electric, gas, etc.).Chinese silk, today also is sold the most in China only.

Geography
Different from the East coast of China, the silk industry has more emphasis on silk reprocessing, Western parts is more focused on raw silk production due to its natural weather and soil conditions, mostly in Chongqing and Yunnan areas. Also as the land cost and manpower cost is increasing on the east coast, business is shifting to the west. With the government's preferential policies, Chongqing's silk industry has seen some significant developments. It is thought that silk was exported along the Silk Road routes by 400BC or so.

Foreign investment
Foreign investment has helped develop the silk industry. Foreign investment has optimized the structure of local silk companies, and brought in new technology.

See also
 China Western Development
 History of silk
 Sericulture
 Chinese ornamental gold silk

References

Industry in China
Silk